KMYT (94.5 MHz) is an alternative rock FM radio station in Temecula, California. The station is owned and operated by iHeartMedia, Inc. The station's webcast is on the iHeartRadio app.  KMYT shares studios and offices with co-owned KTMQ, as well as the iHeart Riverside-San Bernardino stations, on Iowa Avenue in Riverside.

The transmitter is off Via Labanca in a rural part of Temecula.

History
This station signed on in 1999 as KTMK, owned by Clear Channel Communications, based in San Antonio.  KTMK began simulcasting San Diego sister station KOGO shortly after it went on the air.  Clear Channel wanted a more reliable signal for KOGO in southern Riverside County, which has become a significant suburb of San Diego (and also of Los Angeles, for that matter). The call sign became KOGO-FM in 2001.

One year later, Clear Channel changed the simulcast from KOGO to that of co-owned San Diego hot adult contemporary station KMYI.  The Temecula station became KMYT. The format lasted for two years until the simulcast was broken and the station flipped to smooth jazz, which would last 10 years. At this point, it became a local station for the Temecula area, alongside co-owned KTMQ.

While smooth jazz was a popular format in Southern California, achieving high ratings for KTWV in Los Angeles and KIFM in San Diego, the format began to fade by the early 2000s.  KMYT hung on with the format a while longer, but flipped to an Adult Album Alternative (AAA) format, branded as "Radio 94.5", on August 29, 2014.

Clear Channel spun off their radio stations into iHeartMedia in September 2014.

Following KLVJ's switch to Contemporary Christian Music in September 2015, KMYT became the only commercially operating AAA station in Southern California, if not the entire state.

In February 2019, the station unveiled a new logo, still keeping the "Radio" brand, to be followed nearly one year later by a shift to a CHR-leaning alternative format, leaving non-commercial KCSN as the only AAA-formatted station in Southern California. The format shift occurred on January 29, 2020, at midnight, with the first song being "Thunder" by Imagine Dragons. This station is not a live station as all the voices are pre-recorded days in advance and not local in the community.

Sports programming
As of 2019, KMYT is now the radio home of the Lake Elsinore Storm minor league baseball games, which were previously carried on Entercom's country station KXFG. Storm games are the only brokered programming carried by KMYT.

References

External links
Official website

MYT (FM)
Temecula, California
IHeartMedia radio stations
Modern rock radio stations